Ștefan Baiaram (born 31 December 2002) is a Romanian professional footballer who plays as a winger for Liga I club Universitatea Craiova.

Club career
Baiaram made his professional debut for Universitatea Craiova on 11 July 2019, coming on for Bogdan Vătăjelu in the 90th minute of a 3–2 win over Sabail in the first qualifying round of the UEFA Europa League. Three days later, he started in a Liga I fixture against Academica Clinceni, also a 3–2 victory.

During his his first season as a senior at the club, Baiaram amassed 13 appearances in all competitions without scoring. On 27 August 2020, he netted his first goal for the Alb-albaștrii in a 1–2 Europa League away loss to Locomotive Tbilisi. He recorded his debut goal in the top flight on 6 March 2021, scoring in a 1–0 defeat of Botoșani.

On 15 May 2021, Baiaram contributed with his team's only goal in a 1–3 Liga I loss to defending champions CFR Cluj, and one week later played in the 3–2 victory against Astra Giurgiu in the Cupa României final. At the start of the 2022–23 campaign, Baiaram was handed over the number 10 shirt.

Personal life
Baiaram was abandoned by his parents at a hospital in his native Băilești, Dolj County, at the age of six months.

Career statistics

Club

Honours
Universitatea Craiova
Cupa României: 2020–21
Supercupa României: 2021

References

External links

Ștefan Baiaram at Liga Profesionistă de Fotbal 

2002 births
Living people
People from Băilești
Romanian footballers
Association football wingers
Liga I players
CS Universitatea Craiova players
Romania youth international footballers
Romania under-21 international footballers